Gornja Paklenica is a village in the municipality of Doboj, Bosnia and Herzegovina.
Gornja Paklenica is a populated place close to the city of Doboj, Republika Srpska, Bosnia and Herzegovina. According to the 2013 population census, 403 inhabitants lived in the settlement. It belongs to one of the larger Ozren villages.

References

 Populated places in Doboj
Villages in Republika Srpska